Kenneth Wiggins Maginnis, Baron Maginnis of Drumglass (born 21 January 1938), is a Northern Irish politician and life peer. Since December 2020, he has been suspended from the House of Lords, where he formerly sat for the Ulster Unionist Party (UUP). He was the Ulster Unionist Party  Member of Parliament (MP) for Fermanagh and South Tyrone from 1983 to 2001.

Background
Maginnis was educated at Royal School Dungannon and at Stranmillis College. He worked as a teacher for a number of years before joining the Ulster Defence Regiment (UDR) in 1971. After leaving the British Army with the rank of major in 1981, he became the Ulster Unionist Party (UUP) spokesman on internal security and defence, and was that same year elected to Dungannon District Council, on which he sat for twelve years until losing his seat in 1993.

August 1981 by-election in Fermanagh and South Tyrone
Maginnis was the Ulster Unionist candidate for Fermanagh and South Tyrone in the second by-election in 1981, coming second. This by-election was caused by the death of sitting MP Bobby Sands on hunger strike. As a result of changes to the electoral law with the passing of the Representation of the People Act 1981, another hunger striker could not be nominated. Instead Owen Carron, who had served as Sands' election agent in the earlier election, was nominated and elected as a "Anti-H-Block Proxy Political Prisoner".

Member of Parliament
The following year, he was elected to the failed Northern Ireland Assembly, as a representative for the Fermanagh and South Tyrone constituency. At the 1983 general election he was elected to the House of Commons as the Member of Parliament for the constituency of the same name, defeating Carron who was defending the seat as a Sinn Fein candidate. Two years later, along with the rest of his Unionist colleagues, he resigned his seat in protest at the Anglo-Irish Agreement, but was re-elected in the subsequent by-election. He continued his protest by refusing to pay his car tax, for which he was sentenced to seven days' imprisonment in 1987.

Councillor
He renewed his membership of Dungannon and South Tyrone Borough Council in 2001 when he was elected for Dungannon Town. However, in 2005 he chose to move to the neighbouring Clogher Valley electoral area in an attempt to boost the UUP vote. This strategy backfired and he again lost his seat.

House of Lords
He stood down as an MP at the 2001 general election, and on 20 July of that year was created a life peer taking the title Baron Maginnis of Drumglass, of Carnteel in the County of Tyrone, and took his seat in the House of Lords, sitting initially with the UUP.

In December 2020, the House of Lords Conduct Committee recommended that Maginnis be suspended from the House of Lords for at least 18 months for breaching the Code of Conduct in relation to behaviour that constituted bullying and harassment against four complainants, including homophobic remarks directed at SNP MP Hannah Bardell and Shadow Environment Secretary Luke Pollard. As well as being overheard saying "I am not going to be bullied by queers", he sent an email to James Gray, chair of the All-Party Parliamentary Group for the Armed Forces, with the subject "Discrimination by Homos".

Political views
Maginnis was perceived to be on the more social liberal wing of the UUP along with Lady Hermon. He is one of only three MPs in the Ulster Unionist Party's history not to have been a member of the Orange Order (the other two being Enoch Powell and Lady Hermon), although he was a member of the Apprentice Boys of Derry.

In June 2012, on BBC Northern Ireland's The Stephen Nolan Show, Maginnis stated he was opposed to gay marriage because it was "unnatural" and he did not believe society should "have imposed on it something that is unnatural". He said: "Does that mean that every deviant practice has to be accommodated? Will the next thing be that we legislate for some sort of bestiality?" The comments prompted the Ulster Unionist Party leader, Mike Nesbitt, to state that Maginnis expressed his views in a personal capacity and did not reflect party policy. Maginnis's remarks were condemned by gay rights groups. That same month, at the behest of Nesbitt, he suffered the withdrawal of the UUP party whip over his comments; Maginnis subsequently resigned from the UUP on 28 August 2012.

Controversies
In August 2013, Maginnis was found guilty of an "angry and abusive tirade" following a road rage incident, and was fined.

In 2016, Maginnis received a heavy fine after refusing to pay a small fine for having the wrong ticket for a train journey between Gatwick Airport and London.

See also
 List of Northern Ireland Members of the House of Lords

References

External links
 

1938 births
People educated at the Royal School Dungannon
Living people
People of The Troubles (Northern Ireland)
Ulster Defence Regiment officers
Northern Ireland MPAs 1982–1986
Members of the Northern Ireland Forum
Members of the Parliament of the United Kingdom for Fermanagh and South Tyrone (since 1950)

Ulster Unionist Party members of the House of Commons of the United Kingdom
Members of Dungannon and South Tyrone Borough Council
UK MPs 1983–1987
UK MPs 1987–1992
UK MPs 1992–1997
UK MPs 1997–2001
Ulster Unionist Party life peers
Alumni of Stranmillis University College
Life peers created by Elizabeth II